Elections to the Adur District Council were held on 6 May 1976, with the entire council up for election. The two councillors in Marine elected as Residents were defending their seats as Independents. Overall turnout was recorded at 51.8%.

The election resulted in the council remaining under no overall control.

Election result

This resulted in the following composition of the council:

Ward results

+/- figures represent changes from the last time these wards were contested.

References

1976
1976 English local elections
1970s in West Sussex